The Sky Fides is a Czech single-place paraglider, designed and produced by Sky Paragliders of Frýdlant nad Ostravicí. It is now out of production.

Design and development
The Fides was designed as a beginner glider. The models are each named for their approximate wing area in square metres.

Operational history
Reviewer Noel Bertrand described the Fides in a 2003 review as "pleasant to fly, high performance and well built."

Variants
Fides 26
Small-sized model for lighter pilots. The glider model is DHV 1 certified.
Fides 28
Mid-sized model for medium-weight pilots. The glider model is DHV 1 certified.
Fides 30
Large-sized model for heavier pilots. The glider model is DHV 1 certified.

Specifications (Fides 28)

References

Fides
Paragliders